This is a list of Cypriot football transfers for the 2016–17 winter transfer window by club. Only transfers of clubs in the Cypriot First Division and Cypriot Second Division are included.

The winter transfer window will open on 1 January 2017, although a few transfers took place prior to that date. The window will close at midnight on 1 February 2017. Players without a club may join one at any time, either during or in between transfer windows.

Cypriot First Division

AEK Larnaca

In:

Out:

AEL Limassol

In:

Out:

AEZ Zakakiou

In:

Out:

Anagennisi Deryneia

In:

Out:

Anorthosis Famagusta

In:

Out:

APOEL

In:

Out:

Apollon Limassol

In:

Out:

Aris Limassol

In:

Out:

Doxa Katokopias

In:

Out:

Ermis Aradippou

In:

Out:

Ethnikos Achna

In:

Out:

Karmiotissa Pano Polemidion

In:

Out:

Nea Salamina

In:

Out:

Omonia

In:

Out:

Cypriot Second Division

Akritas Chlorakas

In:

Out:

Alki Oroklini

In:

Out:

ASIL

In:

Out:

Ayia Napa

In:

Out:

ENAD Polis Chrysochous FC

In:

Out:

Enosis Neon Paralimni

In:

Out:

Enosis Neon Parekklisia

In:

Out:

Ethnikos Assia

In:

Out:

Olympiakos Nicosia

In:

Out:

Omonia Aradippou

In:

Out:

Othellos Athienou FC

In:

Out:

PAEEK

In:

Out:

Pafos FC

In:

Out:

ENTHOI Lakatamia FC

In:

Out:

References

Cypriot
tran
Cypriot football transfers